Canale d'Agordo (known as Forno di Canale until 1964; Ladin: Canal, German: Augartnerkanal) is a town and comune in the province of Belluno, in the region of Veneto, northern Italy. It has 1,230 inhabitants. Pope John Paul I (born Albino Luciani) and the landscape painter Giuseppe Zais were born in Canale d'Agordo. It has a Museum dedicated to Pope John Paul I called the Pope Luciani Museum.

Notable people 

 Pope John Paul I, born Albino Luciani
 Giuseppe Zais Painter
 Franco Manfroi Ski mountaineer and cross-country skier

Twin towns — sister cities

 Lacenas in France (since 2006)
 Wadowice in Poland (since 2009)
 Massaranduba, Santa Catarina in Brazil (since 2011)

See also
Annea Clivana

References
Link of the country Canale d'Agordo 
Papa Luciani link to Canale d'Agordo 
Canale d'Agordo travel guide

Demographic evolution

Cities and towns in Veneto